Bremner, Bird and Fortune is a satirical British television programme produced by Vera Productions for Channel Four, uniting the longstanding satirical team of John Bird and John Fortune ("the Two Johns") with the satirical impressionist Rory Bremner. It had 16 series, followed by several one-off episodes.

History

Now Something Else
Rory Bremner's first television series started in 1986 on BBC Two, which ran for seven series. The BBC gave him his own television series after successful shows at the Edinburgh festival. The series also had input from Jeremy Hardy, Steve Nallon, Steve Brown and Enn Reitel. In 1989 John Bird started to collaborate on the show with John Fortune following in 1991. From the fourth series it was renamed The Rory Bremner Show.

Rory Bremner, Who Else?
In 1993 the series moved to Channel 4, and over the six series the show developed into a more hard-edged, satirical and political show whilst satirical sketches of The Jerry Springer Show, Ainsley Harriott and sporting personnel were reduced.

Bremner, Bird and Fortune
By 1999 all non-political sketches were dropped from the show and series was refocused purely on political satire, with a name change.

In 2002 three members of the show's production team, Geoff Atkinson, Steve Connelly and Tristam Shapeero, were nominated for a BAFTA for Best Comedy Programme or Series. Bird and Fortune were nominated for a BAFTA for Best Entertainment Performance in 2001 and Best Comedy Performance in 2002. They did not win, however.

In 2003 the episode "At Her Majesty's Pleasure" won a Broadcasting Press Guild Award for Best Entertainment.

In October 2004, the show's stars published a book based on the show, called You Are Here: A Dossier (Weidenfeld & Nicolson, 288 pages, also available as a paperback from Orion mass market paperback). In 2004 Rory Bremner was nominated for a BAFTA for Best Comedy Performance.

In November 2008 a four-part miniseries was produced called Silly Money. The trio looked at the economic downturn, with fewer of the usual sketches and co-stars. The episodes contained many more George Parr sketches than usual. They also included a number of archive clips to further illustrate points and create satire from them based on hindsight.

The last full series was broadcast in late 2008. Two further series, both having three episodes, focussed more on specific issues. The Last Show Before The Recovery, started on 7 June 2009 and looked at the banking crisis and The Daily Wind-Up, aired from 2–4 May 2010, and focused on the 2010 United Kingdom general election.

Regular features
For most of its run, the show was almost entirely political, but in the later series different genres of sketches were introduced. The programme featured regular stand-up impressionism sections by Bremner. Another feature was interviews between Bird and Fortune, one of them normally as George Parr, a man in a government position or a businessman, who ended up exposing the idiocies of his area of expertise. There were also heavily researched, bitingly satirical three-handed historical narratives; the dinner party sketches, featuring Bird, Fortune, Pauline McLynn and Frances Barber; and other small sketches. Each episode ended with a (usually political) musical number.

Episodes

Now Something Else
Series 1: 5 Episodes (3 March - 7 April 1986)
Series 2: 5 Episodes (3 April - 8 May 1987)
Series 3: 6 Episodes (5 May - 2 June 1988)

From this point onwards renamed Rory Bremner Show
Series 4: 6 Episodes (31 March - 5 May 1989)
Series 5: 6 Episodes (20 May - 25 June 1990)
Series 6: 6 Episodes (15 March - 19 April 1991)
Series 7: 6 Episodes (8 May - 12 June 1992)

Rory Bremner, Who Else?
Series 1: 9 Episodes (9 October - 4 December 1993)
Series 2: 10 Episodes (8 October - 10 December 1994)
Series 3: 8 Episodes (7 October 1995) - (25 November 1995)
Series 4: 8 Episodes (5 April 1996) - (24 May 1996)
Series 5: 10 Episodes 27 September 1996) - (29 November 1996)
Series 6: 7 Episodes (24 October 1997) (12 December 1997)
Series 7: 8 Episodes (11 October 1998) - (6 December 1998)

60 episodes in total.

Bremner, Bird and Fortune
A near full list of most episodes can be viewed on the BFI website: https://web.archive.org/web/20140101142653/http://ftvdb.bfi.org.uk/sift/series/32481

References

External links

YouTube - Bremner Bird, and Fortune's Clips

1999 British television series debuts
2010 British television series endings
1990s British satirical television series
1990s British television sketch shows
2000s British satirical television series
2000s British television sketch shows
2010s British satirical television series
2010s British television sketch shows
Channel 4 sketch shows
English-language television shows
Television shows shot at Teddington Studios